Méricourt is a commune in the Pas-de-Calais department in the Hauts-de-France region of France.

Geography
The commune is part of the canton of Avion.

History
The history of the region remains marked by the Courrières mine disaster, which left 1,099 dead on 10 March 1906. The communes affected were Méricourt, Billy-Montigny, Noyelles-sous-Lens and Sallaumines.

It was at Méricourt that the memorial to the mining disaster was erected. Since 2006, the memorial has also included an overground pathway retracing the route underground of the survivors who managed to get out of the galleries about three weeks after the collapse and resulting firedamp and dust.

Population

Places of interest
 The church of St.Martin, rebuilt along with most of the town, after the First World War.
 The church of St. Barbe, dating from the nineteenth century.
 Vestiges of an old chateau.
 The memorials.

See also
Communes of the Pas-de-Calais department

References

External links

 Official town website 

Communes of Pas-de-Calais
Artois